Chipewyan 201F is an Indian reserve of the Athabasca Chipewyan First Nation in Alberta, located within the Regional Municipality of Wood Buffalo. 

It is on the east bank of the Athabasca River, 30 miles south of Embarras Portage.

References

Indian reserves in Alberta